Filatima epulatrix is a moth of the family Gelechiidae. It is found in North America, where it has been recorded from British Columbia, New York, Oklahoma, Ontario and Quebec.

The wingspan is 15.5-17.5 mm. The forewings are streaked with pale yellowish white, brownish orange, and dark grey and with purple reflections. The anterior 
half is paler than the dorsal half, the latter mainly dark grey overlaid with metallic purple. The hindwings are mainly pale grey, veins darker grey.

The larvae feed on Malus sylvestris.

References

Moths described in 1969
Filatima